Edward John Wood (23 October 1919 – October 1993) was an English footballer who played as an outside-left, and later in both inside-forward positions. He played in the Football League for West Ham United and Leyton Orient.

Wood played amateur football with Leytonstone, and once for England, before signing as a professional with West Ham United in 1937. His debut came with a 0–4 mauling of Manchester United in the Second Division on 23 February 1938. He made ten appearances for the Hammers in his first two seasons, but his three appearances and two goals in 1939–40 were subsequently struck from the record after the outbreak of World War II. He served as a Territorial with the Essex Regiment during the conflict.

After the war, and the resumption of football for the 1945–46 season, Wood made a further 48 appearances, scoring 13 goals, until his departure in 1949. His first goals for the club came with a brace against Arsenal in a 6–0 FA Cup win on 5 January 1946.

Wood joined east London neighbours Leyton Orient in October 1949. He made ten appearances in the League for Orient. He joined Kent League club Margate the following season.

References

1919 births
1993 deaths
Military personnel from London
Footballers from Canning Town
English footballers
Association football outside forwards
Association football inside forwards
Leytonstone F.C. players
West Ham United F.C. players
Leyton Orient F.C. players
English Football League players
Margate F.C. players
British Army personnel of World War II
Essex Regiment soldiers
Kent Football League (1894–1959) players